The Chicago Blaze were a women's professional basketball team in the National Women's Basketball League (NWBL).  Based in Chicago, Illinois, they played from 2002 until folding in 2005.

External links
NWBL website (archive link)
WABA website

Blaze